International Socialist Alternative is an international association of Trotskyist political parties.

The group was founded in 1974 as the Committee for a Workers' International, by supporters of Militant from 12 countries. In August 2019, a faction left and formed a separate organisation called the "refounded CWI". After initially calling themselves the "CWI Majority", the remaining group relaunched under the name International Socialist Alternative in February 2020. The ISA has groups in 30 countries.

History

The CWI split
In 2018 and 2019, a dispute developed in the organization around the questions of socialists being part of feminist and LGBT movements, the role of the trade unions and the working-class movement, and under what programme and how Marxists ought to organize internationally and domestically. This ultimately led to a split. The dispute divided the leading bodies of the CWI with International Secretariat and International Executive Committee taking conflicting positions.

One group, which had founded the “In Defence of a Working Class and Trotskyist CWI” (IDWCTCWI) faction in November 2018 in support of the CWI's International Secretariat, declared in July 2019 that they were dissolving the CWI and that they were the refounded CWI.

The majority of the organisation, in support of the majority of the CWI's International Executive Committee, continued to operate, and renamed itself International Socialist Alternative on 1 February 2020, to distinguish themselves from the faction which had split and taken that name.

Details
The dispute was sparked in 2018 around what the CWI's International Secretariat described as a watering down of the Socialist Programme of its Irish section and the tendency of its leaders to see "all struggles through the prism of the women’s movement, rather than seeing how it interconnects with other struggles". At the time of initial split in August 2019 the Irish section was one of the few sections of the CWI to have had any success in electoral politics. It had 3 elected Members of Dáil Éireann. The February 2020 election saw the loss of one of those seats. Another Socialist Party TD left the Party during the course of the dispute. This resulted in the Irish section of the ISA having one TD in the new Dáil term.

In 2019, the CWI split. The leading body of the CWI is the World Congress, which elected an International Executive Committee (IEC) to govern between congresses. The IEC then appointed an International Secretariat (IS) which is responsible for the day-to-day work of the International. The majority of the IS founded a faction called  “In Defence of a Working Class and Trotskyist CWI” (IDWCTCWI) in November 2018 at an IEC meeting, in opposition to the rest of the IEC. This faction held criticisms of a number of national sections of the CWI. The majority of the IEC disagreed with the faction's criticisms, and took issue with the methods used by faction members to conduct the debate, which included talk of expelling one of the sections the faction was criticising.

The majority of the Spanish, Venezuelan, Mexican, and Portuguese sections, the first three of which had joined the CWI in 2017 after leaving the International Marxist Tendency, initially supported the IS faction but in April 2019 split with them and then left the CWI altogether to form their own international tendency, International Revolutionary Left. In Spain, a minority which supported the CWI Majority reconstituted themselves as Socialismo Revolucionario, which has been the CWI's section in Spain prior to its 2017 merger with Izquierda Revolucionaria. A minority in Mexico and Portugal also remained in the CWI and supported the CWI Majority.

The faction's leadership was concentrated in the Socialist Party (England and Wales), which was the largest section of the CWI, as a number of members served on both the leading body of the England & Wales section and on the IS, including its general secretary, Peter Taaffe. The faction attracted support from an overall minority of the CWI's national sections. Most of the IEC, and most of the CWI's national sections, stood in opposition to the faction. But both the Faction, and its opponents claimed a majority of the individual members.

The IEC outlined a process of discussion and debate to avoid a split, leading to a World Congress in January 2020, the highest decision-making body of the CWI. The Taaffe-led IS faction initially agreed, then withdrew their participation from the committee charged with organizing the debate, and declared they would not participate in the IEC or the World Congress. A Special Conference of the Socialist Party of England and Wales voted by a margin of 173 – 35 to support the Faction and sponsor the International Faction conference. This conference was held in July 2019, open only to CWI members who supported the faction, and asserted that they had 'dissolved and refounded' the CWI. The majority of the CWI continued operating and held an IEC meeting in August 2019, and declared they will "provisionally organize the renewed international organization with the name “CWI – Majority”."

In September 2019, a minority faction of the South African section, the Workers and Socialist Party (WASP), left WASP and formed the Marxist Workers Party in support of the Refounded CWI. The remainder of the WASP declared itself for the CWI Majority. The same month, a majority of the German section voted by a 2 to 1 margin to support the CWI Majority. The minority faction formed a new organisation, Sozialistische Organisation Solidarität – (Sol), supporting the Refounded CWI.

In June 2020 a group of members of the DSM (the CWI section in Nigeria) announced that they were leaving the CWI to form the Movement for a Socialist Alternative, affiliated to ISA.
 
The CWI Majority/ISA claims a presence in 32 countries, making up the majority of the CWI. The Refounded CWI claims to have sections in 11 countries.

At the CWI Majority World Congress on 1 February 2020, the name of the organisation was changed to International Socialist Alternative.

The ISA has published their perspectives on the split. The CWI has also published the main documents from the debate leading up to the split.

Splits and Disaffiliation 
In March 2021, the majority of International Socialist Forward, the former Taiwanese branch of China-Hong Kong-Taiwan section, publicly declared a split from the China-Hong Kong-Taiwan section, and the ISA organization. The reasons cited included a disagreement in the approach to use of online media, and a turn toward Taiwanese nationalism by International Socialist Forward.

In March 2021, Socialist Action in Australia split from ISA after ISA objected to their treatment of the victim in a sexual assault case.

On 24 June 2021, Xekinima, the Greek section, along with the sections in Cyprus and Turkey, declared disaffiliation from ISA. Reasons included a disagreement on perspectives regarding neoliberalism, disagreement with the ISA adopting a code of conduct on sexual harassment, disagreement with the ISA's objection to victim-blaming in Socialist Action in Australia, and a related disagreement with the ISA having an international focus rather than being a federation of national sections left to operate on their own.

On the same day the majority of Socialismo Revolucionario the Spanish section, citing the alleged autocratic handling of the section announced their decision to break with ISA.

These organisations later published the rationale for their split, including the many documents relating to their debate with the ISA majority on their website.

International campaigns
In addition to the work carried out across its various national sections, the ISA also runs three international campaigns.

Rosa
The international socialist feminist campaign named after Rosa Luxemburg and Rosa Parks aims to build the socialist-feminist wing of the Labour movement. It claims that fighting all forms of misogyny and sexism is linked to the fight for rent control and public housing; the fight for decent and equal pay; the climate justice movement; and fighting racism, transphobia & the far-right. And that socialist feminism means breaking with establishment feminism that seeks to feminise the capitalist elite. 25 November is the International Day Against Violence Against Women. Rosa marked it with demonstrations in a number of cities  In Taiwan the occasion was marked by an ISA demonstration in support of Peng Shuai. Peng's whereabouts and safety have become a matter of international concern after she early this month disappeared after she accused former Chinese vice premier Zhang Gaoli of sexual abuse.

System Change, Not Climate Change — Fight For A Socialist Alternative
The campaign insists that it is capitalism which is destroying the planet so what is needed is large scale, system changes — otherwise the effects of global warming will be out of control. At the COP-26 conference in Glasgow ISA organised a lively contingent on the demonstration. spokesperson Danny Said "We need to make sure that COP26 can hear the voice of the working class”

Stop repression in Hong Kong 
As part of the current subversion trial the Chinese regime has rounded up almost the entire crop of opposition leaders and proposed candidates, from across the spectrum of anti-government politics, including trade unionists, pro-Western liberals and right wing localists (a Hong Kong nationalist movement). Among them are former legislators like ‘Long Hair’ who was elected five times to the now sidelined Legislative Council (Legco). The campaign claims "the best support for the democracy struggle will come from inspiring grassroots solidarity — from labour, social and civil rights movements who are fighting on behalf of the oppressed and disenfranchised in their own societies. To fight repression and authoritarian rule in Hong Kong — and China — we need people’s solidarity across national borders."

Structure

Sections

Associated organisations
 Youth against Racism in Europe
 ROSA (ISA), the socialist feminist campaign of the ISA

See also
 List of Trotskyist internationals
 Revolutionary socialism

References

External links
 

 
Trotskyist political internationals
International Socialist Organisations